James John Peirson (born 13 October 1992) is an Australian cricketer.

Domestic career
Peirson plays for Queensland and the Redlands Tigers in Brisbane Grade Cricket. He made his One Day debut on 17 October 2013 for Queensland against New South Wales.  He made his first-class debut for Cricket Australia XI against the West Indians during their tour of Australia in December 2015.

Peirson was Queensland's youngest-ever Sheffield Shield winning captain when the Queensland Bulls won the competition in 2018. He was part of Queensland's 2020-2021 Sheffield Shield winning side for the second time in his career when the Queensland Bulls defeated New South Wales by an innings and 33 runs at Allan Border Field. In November 2020, in the fourth round of the 2020–21 Sheffield Shield season, Peirson scored his maiden century in first-class cricket.

References

External links

Living people
1992 births
Cricketers from Queensland
Brisbane Heat cricketers
Queensland cricketers
People educated at Brisbane State High School
Queensland cricket captains
Cricket Australia XI cricketers
Wicket-keepers